Ralph A. Dunn (February 28, 1914 – May 3, 2004) was an American businessman and politician.

Born in Pinckneyville, Illinois, Dunn was a real estate investor and lived in Du Quoin, Illinois. Dunn was also in the concrete business and owned a car dealership. He served as a delegate in the Sixth Illinois Constitutional Convention of 1970. Dunn served in the Illinois House of Representatives from 1973 to 1985 and was a Republican. He then served in the Illinois State Senate from 1985 until 1995. On May 3, 2004, Dunn died of complications from pneumonia in a hospital in Du Quoin, Illinois.

Notes

1914 births
2004 deaths
People from Pinckneyville, Illinois
Businesspeople from Illinois
Republican Party members of the Illinois House of Representatives
Republican Party Illinois state senators
20th-century American politicians
People from Du Quoin, Illinois
20th-century American businesspeople
Deaths from pneumonia in Illinois